Austrian law allows firearm possession on shall-issue basis with certain classes of shotguns and rifles available without permit. With approximately 30 civilian firearms per 100 people, Austria is the 14th most armed country in the world.

History 
 1853-1938 – Waffenpatent allows firearm ownership without permit for any non-prohibited person. Carry required permit which was being issued to respectable citizens.
 1938-1945 – Nazi laws adds restrictions. Certain groups of people, including Jews were prohibited from owning firearms.
 1945-1967 – previous law largely remains in effect, right of Jews to bear arms is restored.
 1967-1996 – new law regulating handguns goes into effect. It contains right of the law-abiding citizens to own handguns.
 1994 – pump-action shotguns are banned. A few hundred were turned in, 2,000 were registered and legalized and around 40,000 disappeared and went illegal.
 1996 – today – Weapons Act is passed in accordance with EU law.

Legal framework 
In Austria the Waffengesetz (Weapons Act) defines weapons as objects that are designed to directly eliminate or reduce the ability of people to attack or defend themselves or for firing projectiles during hunting or sport shooting. §2 further defines firearms as weapons where projectiles can be fired from a barrel in a predefined direction.

Firearm licensing 
Austria law divides firearms into three categories:
 Category A with its two subcategories
war material includes automatic firearms, armor-piercing weapons, tanks;
restricted weapons includes weapons disguised as other objects, firearms which can be disassembled in a faster than usual fashion for hunting and sport, shotguns with an overall length of less than 90 cm (35 in) or barrel length shorter than 45 cm (18 in), pump action shotguns, suppressors and firearms with suppressors, knuckledusters, blackjacks, steel rods;
 Category B includes handguns, repeating shotguns and semi-automatic rifles;
 Category C includes repeating, revolving and break-action rifles, break-action shotguns and projectile firing electroshock weapons

Category C 
Any non-prohibited Austrian citizen over 18 can buy firearms from categories C without permit after three-day background check. They need to be registered six weeks after acquisition. The law requires the owner to provide a good reason during registration. Good reasons according to law are: self-defense at home, hunting, sport shooting and collection. There is no limit on number of category C weapons that one can possess. The three-day background check is not needed when buying from private or when the buyer has a firearms license or hunting license.

Category B 

Acquisition of category B weapons requires a firearm license (Waffenbesitzkarte). Authorities shall issue license to any non-prohibited citizen of European Economic Area over 21 who has a good reason (law stipulates self-defense at home as a good reason) which allows purchase of up to two handguns. Authorities may issue a license to person below 21, but over 18, non-citizen of EEA or person seeking to own more than two handguns. Since 2019 the autorities shall issue a license for up to 5 weapons after having a license for two weapons for 5 or more years.

Category A 
Category A weapons require further exceptions to be granted for holders, except in the case of suppressed weapons, which may be held by those with valid hunting licenses. War material like automatic firearms requires a further special federal permit, which is in practice only granted to approved collectors and experts.

Carrying firearms 

Carrying firearms in public generally requires a carry permit (or "Waffenpass"). Carry permits are issued by the authorities on a shall issue or may issue basis, depending on reason and applicant. It is not necessary to have an additional firearm license as the Austrian carry permit includes all the rights of a firearms license with the addition of the right to carry those firearms. Austrian law makes no distinction between concealed or open carry; with a carry permit, the holder may carry their weapon(s) freely throughout the whole country and even in certain "weapon free zones". However, holders must carry their weapons in a way that does not constitute a public nuisance; for example, openly displaying a handgun in one's belt at the cinema while wearing civil clothing would be considered unusual and could be considered a public nuisance if the police were called.

Storing firearms 
Firearms and ammunition have to be stored securely in a reasonable manner to prevent unauthorized access. There are no general storage requirements for firearms and ammunition inside someones own habitation and every gun owner is responsible for keeping his firearms and ammunition stored secure. As self defense is a recognized reason by the law to own firearms, keeping firearms stored in loaded condition inside someones own habitation is allowed. However, if someone has 20 or more firearms stored in a close area to each other or ammunition on a large scale (more than 5.000 rounds) he has to inform the suitable authorities which storage measure he has taken to ensure safe storage and protection against unauthorized access (for example a gun safe). Such a notification is required again when the number of firearms stored in a close area to each other has doubled since the last communication to the Authority.

Firearm possession 
As of 2019 there are 1,068,582 (or 12 per 100 people) registered firearms in Austria owned by 320,352 people (6.5% of population). 198,834 of them have Category B firearm license and 74,527 people (0.8% of population) have carry permit. 75,526 people (0.8% of population) are prohibited from owning firearms Small Arms Survey estimates that there are approximately 1,740,000 unregistered and illegal firearms in Austria.

See also 
 Overview of gun laws by nation

References

External links 
 

Austria
Law of Austria
Gun politics in Austria